Stomopteryx speciosella is a moth of the family Gelechiidae. It was described by Zerny in 1936. It is found in Morocco.

References

Moths described in 1936
Stomopteryx